Christian Peter Georg Kampmann (24 July 1939 in Hellerup – 13 September 1988 on Læsø) was a Danish writer and journalist. His novels are mainly about the middle and upper classes in the post war time and until the 1980s. The books are mainly about people who has some problems finding their place in the world and their feelings, e.g. homosexuality. Kampmann was bisexual himself, although he was married to piano player Therese Herman Koppel for many years and had two children.

Kampmann was involved in the Danish Gay Liberation Front from 1975 and he was editor of the journal Sexual Policy from 1975 to 1978. In 1988, he was killed at his beach house on Læsø by his cohabitant and lover, Danish author Jens Michael Schau. The murder was profiled in Jonas Poher Rasmussen's 2015 film What He Did (Det han gjorde).

Books 
 Blandt venner (1962), Short story collection
 Al den snak om lykke (1963), his first novel
 Ly (1965), Short story collection
 Sammen (1967), novel
 Uden navn (1969), novel
 Nærved og næsten (1969), novel
 Vi elsker mere (1970), Short story collection
 Pinde til en skønskrivers ligkiste (1971)
 En tid alene (1972), novel
 Familien Gregersen-sagaen:
 Visse hensyn (1973) 
 Faste forhold (1974)
 Rene linjer (spring 1975)
 Andre måder (fall 1974)
 Fornemmelser, trilogy:
 Fornemmelser (1977)
 Videre trods alt (1979)
 I glimt (1980)  
 Skilles og mødes (1992), novel released after his death

References 

1939 births
1988 deaths
Bisexual men
Bisexual novelists
Bisexual journalists
Danish LGBT novelists
Danish LGBT journalists
Danish murder victims
20th-century Danish male writers
20th-century Danish journalists
20th-century Danish LGBT people